Hodcarrier Films is Kevin Willmott's film production company, located in Lawrence, Kansas, USA.

Films produced
Ninth Street
C.S.A.: The Confederate States of America
Bunker Hill

External links
CSA - Official Movie Site
Bunker Hill Website

Film production companies of the United States
Lawrence, Kansas
Companies based in Kansas